Trialeurodes (Greenhouse whitefly) is a large genus of whiteflies in the family Aleyrodidae.

Species

References

Whiteflies